Hugh Cairns , (4 December 1896 – 2 November 1918) was a Canadian recipient of the Victoria Cross, the highest and most prestigious award for gallantry in the face of the enemy that can be awarded to British and Commonwealth forces.

Background
He was born in Ashington, Northumberland, England. The Cairns family immigrated to Canada and settled in Saskatoon, Saskatchewan in 1911 when he was 15 years old. He was a member of the Christ Church Choir, and as a keen footballer, he played for the Christ Church Intermediate Boys Football club, reaching the championship of the Sunday School League, scoring one goal in 104 matches. He also played for the St. Thomas Church team when they won the Saskatoon League Championship in 1915.

Hugh and his elder brother Albert enlisted in the army in August 1915. Cairns was awarded the Distinguished Conduct Medal (DCM) for his actions at the Battle of Vimy Ridge in April 1917. At the time the DCM was the second highest award for gallantry in the British honours system.

VC details

He was 21 years old, and a sergeant in the 46th (South Saskatchewan) Battalion, Canadian Expeditionary Force during the Hundred Days Offensive of the First World War when the following deed took place for which he was awarded the VC.

With the German surrender and armistice on 11 November, ten days later, Sergeant Cairns would prove to be the last of seventy-one Canadians to earn the Victoria Cross for his actions in the Great War. Cairns was also awarded the Légion d'honneur by the Government of France.

Cairns is buried in the Auberchicourt British Cemetery, seven kilometres east of Douai, France, roughly sixteen kilometres north of Cambrai, (Plot I, Row A, Grave 8).

Legacy
His Victoria Cross is displayed at the Canadian War Museum in Ottawa, Canada.

In March 1936, the town of Valenciennes renamed a street in the vicinity of his actions on November 1, 1918 "Avenue du Sergent Cairns" and a plaque commemorating his valorous actions  was installed on the side of a building opposite the Place du Canada on the street that bears his name.

Cairns has several buildings and locations named after him in his hometown of Saskatoon, Saskatchewan, including Hugh Cairns V.C. School (an elementary school that opened in 1960), the Hugh Cairns V.C. Armoury, and the Footballer's Memorial, a statue of Cairns in Kinsmen Park. The school is located on Cairns Avenue, however the street was not named for Hugh Cairns, but rather for Saskatoon pioneer John Cairns.

References

Further reading 
Monuments to Courage (David Harvey, 1999)
The Register of the Victoria Cross (This England, 1997)
VCs of the First World War – The Final Days 1918 (Gerald Gliddon, 2000)
 Canada's V.C.s (George C. Machum, 1956)
The London Gazette

External links
Hugh Cairns digitized service file
French site edited from mont Houy at Valenciennes ( France). Follow Canada 1914–1918

Canadian World War I recipients of the Victoria Cross
1896 births
1918 deaths
Military personnel from Northumberland
People from Ashington
Canadian recipients of the Distinguished Conduct Medal
British emigrants to Canada
Chevaliers of the Légion d'honneur
Canadian military personnel killed in World War I
Canadian Expeditionary Force soldiers
People from Saskatoon
Burials in France